Puya sanctae-crucis is a species of flowering plant in the Bromeliaceae family. It is endemic to Bolivia.

References

sanctae-crucis
Endemic flora of Bolivia
Taxa named by John Gilbert Baker
Taxa named by Lyman Bradford Smith